Andrey Alekseyevich Shishkin (born 1960) is a Russian painter. His works are one of the most prominent examples of the modern Russian "pagan art" scene related to Slavic Native Faith in Russia.

He was born and raised in Moscow. He has dealt with painting since the beginning of 2000s and he currently works in a private studio. His main directions of creativity are portraits and historical paintings in realist attempt. Special theme in his works is Slavic mythology and history.

References

External links

 Official artist website

21st-century Russian painters
Artists from Moscow
Russian male painters
1960 births
Living people
21st-century Russian male artists